Socratic Citizenship is a philosophy book by Dana Villa that proposes how contemporary citizenship can draw from Socrates' dissident citizenship in Athens. He follows the references to Socrates in the works of Hannah Arendt, John Stuart Mill, Friedrich Nietzsche, Leo Strauss, and Max Weber.

References

External links 
 

2001 non-fiction books
Books in political philosophy
Works about Socrates
Princeton University Press books
English-language books
American non-fiction books
Works about citizenship